The Golden Horse Award for Best Sound Effects is an award presented annually at the Golden Horse Awards by the Taipei Golden Horse Film Festival Executive Committee. The latest ceremony was held in 2022, with R.T Kao, Rockid Lee and Richard Hocks winning the award for the film Incantation.

References

Golden Horse Film Awards